Romance with Double-Bass is a Russian silent comedy short film released in 1911. Directed by Kai Hanson, it is based on the 1886 short story of the same name by the Russian writer Anton Chekhov.  The film was released seven years after his death, the time Chekhov thought people would stop reading his work.

This is the second film adaptation of Chekhov's writings and the first that has been preserved — the 1909 adaptation of Surgery by Pyotr Chardynin is considered to be lost.

Cast
Nikolai Vasilyev as a musician
Vera Gorskaya as knyazna Bibulova

Critical reception
The reviewer of the Sine-Phono journal № 2 (1911) called it "a movie with wonderful acting and amazingly clear and juicy photography and beautiful locations where the action takes place". He wrote that the filmmakers had shown all respect that Anton Chekhov's name deserved.

References

External links
 Romance with a Double Bass, view online at filmannex.com
 Romance with a Double Bass at imdb

Films based on works by Anton Chekhov
Russian silent short films
1911 short films
1911 comedy films
1911 films
Russian comedy short films
Russian black-and-white films
Films directed by Kai Hansen
Films of the Russian Empire
Films based on short fiction
Silent comedy films